Birkenshaw is a village in North Lanarkshire, Scotland, to the east of Glasgow, and in proximity to Uddingston, Tannochside and Viewpark. Historically part of Lanarkshire Birkenshaw is largely a housing estate, but is more widely known for the Birkenshaw trading estate, popular with couples on weekends for its range of DIY, electrical and furniture stores. Birkenshaw is considered as part of Viewpark and is contained within the Greater Glasgow conurbation.

It gained some notoriety after Peter Manuel, the "beast of Birkenshaw", committed some murders there.

References

External links
Uddingston and Tannochside History Society

Villages in North Lanarkshire
Greater Glasgow